Alejandro Lozano Morales, (March 17, 1939 – March 30, 2003) was a Spanish artist, painter and mosaic muralist.

Life 
Alejandro Lozano was born in La Toba, Guadalajara, Spain. He studied humanities at the El Pardo Seminary (Madrid, Spain) from 1951 to 1957. On 13 March 1965 he received ordination. During 1965-1969 studied at the Conservatori Municipal d’Arts Massana (Applied Arts School) of Barcelona, where he attained the Applied Arts Graduate grade, with a specialization in painting, mural and refurbishment proceedings. Being a Capuchin brother he lived at the Pompeia cloister in Barcelona.
During July and August 1966, he attended the courses ‘Corsi estivi di Pintura en la Scola di Belli Arti Prieto Vanucci’ in Perugia (Italy). This same year he entered the Fine Arts University of Barcelona (Escola Superior de Belles Arts Sant Jordi).
During 1968 he attended courses ‘Corso de alta cultura’ at the ‘Università Italiana per etranieri’ in Perugia, Italy, and had the exhibition ‘Mostra in Centro Internazionale’ (Crocevia).

Between 1970 and 1972 he finished "Good News", a mosaic mural (10x2 m) for the altarpiece of the church at Ciutat Residencial de E. i D. in Marbella (Málaga, Spain). The curved surface of the mural adapts to the wall in an embracing gesture.

From 1972 through 1974 he realizes the big format work "Calvary" (9x5 m). It is a mosaic placed at the major altar in the Cathedral of Tucupita (Delta Amacuro, Venezuela). Simultaneously he makes the mosaics "Saint Francis and Brother Sun" (15 m2), for the right side nave of this cathedral, and "Divina Pastora" (15 m2), for the link side nave.

During the period 1973-1974 he finishes the Drawing Teaching courses at the Fine Arts University (Escola Superior de Belles Arts) in Barcelona. He obtains the Drawing Teacher certificate, which allows him to widen his teaching activity that started already long ago.

From 1975 through 1978 he produces the murals "Annuntiation", "Catequesis", "Baptism in the mission", "Christ and the Samaritan" (3x2 m2) and "Christ’s Baptism " for Tucupita’s Cathedral façade. "Santa Cecilia", "Saint Francis trusted by an angel", "Saint Pius X" and "Saint Toribio de Mogrovejo", are round mosaic murals for the choir and central nave of the cathedral.

1975 May he receives papal dispensation and marries to Francisca Tormo in Esparreguera (Catalonia, Spain).

From November to October 1978 he undertakes his second travel to Venezuela and carries on the ensemble of the façade, choir and central nave murals of Tucupita’s Cathedral.

July 1981 he becomes graduate in Fine Arts by the University of Barcelona.

September 26, 1982 Tucupita's Cathedral is inaugurated with attendance of Nuncio, several Bishops and the president of the Venezuela Republic.

Later on, he continues his artistic mural and painting works, working as a painting and drawing teacher as well, in Barcelona his beloved city. He died in Barcelona, aged 63.

Works 
1972-1982 Altarpieces for interiors and façade of Tucupita’s Cathedral, (Delta Amacuro, Venezuela).
1974. "Arribada de Colom davant els reis Catòlics" (Arrival of Christopher Columbus before the Catholic Monarchs). Mosaic mural.
1975. Mural "Colón en la puerta de la Paz" (Columbus at Peace’s Door).
1984. "Y al fondo la Catedral" (The Cathedral on the background), oil on canvas from the "Barcelona Monumental" series. "Champán y tres naranjas", mosaic from Greece.
1985. "Y al fondo, monumento a Colón" (Columbus monument on the background), mosaic from "Barcelona Monumental" series.
1987. Mosaic altarpiece (5,25x4,25m2) for Bellamar’s Church devoted to Saint Eulalia of Barcelona (Castelldefels, Barcelona, Spain).
1988-89. "San Juan Bosco y Maria Auxiliadora", mosaic mural for Salesian church façade (Huesca, Spain).
1991. "Los cuatro evangelistas" (The four evangelists), four round murals (1m diameter) for the main church in Tivenys (Tarragona, Spain).

Exhibitions 
1965 December.  Collective exhibition at gallery ‘Sala d’Art Canuda’ (Barcelona, Spain).
1968 "Mostra in Centro Internazionale" (Crocevia, Italy).
1974. Galeria Prócer (Barcelona). Ensemble of the three altarpieces for Tucupita’s Cathedral  "The Calvary", "Saint Francis and Brother Sun" and "Divina Pastora".
1983. Mosaic exhibition at gallery ‘Sala Turó de la Peira’ (Barcelona, Spain).
1990, November. Oil paintings and mosaics exhibition at the ‘Sala Pau Claris’, Barcelona.
2000, Oil paintings and mosaics exhibition at the ‘Sala Fort Pienc’, Barcelona.

References 
Enciclopedia ‘Ràfols Dictionary of Catalan, Balearic and Valencian artists’: 'Diccionari Ràfols d'Artistes de Catalunya, Balears i València'
Galart art magazine (Monographic report, 1991, Barcelona)
Skira Publication of 19th- and 20th-Century Catalan Painting: Skira de la pintura catalana dels segles XIX i XX (Vol.4, Editorial Carroggio)

External links
Church in Tivenys, Tarragona, Spain
Massana Art School, Barcelona

20th-century Spanish painters
20th-century male artists
Spanish male painters
1939 births
2003 deaths
Spanish muralists
Capuchins